The Strange Monsieur Victor (French: L'Étrange Monsieur Victor) is a 1938 French-German drama film directed by Jean Grémillon and starring Raimu, Pierre Blanchar and Madeleine Renaud. It was shot at the Tempelhof Studios in Berlin. The film's sets were designed by the art directors Otto Hunte and Willy Schiller. The film was made by the German major studio Universum Film AG in collaboration with its French subsidiary. It was the thirteenth most popular film at the French box office in 1938.

Synopsis
Victor Agardanne, a respectable businessman in Toulon, secretly works as a fence receiving stolen goods. When he is threatened with blackmail over his clandestine activities, he murders the man. He allows an innocent man to be arrested for the crime and be sent to a South American penal colony. When the wronged man escapes from prison, he heads back to Toulon to seek revenge against whoever really committed the murder.

Cast
 Raimu as Victor Agardanne
 Pierre Blanchar as Bastien Robineau
 Madeleine Renaud as Magdeleine Agardanne
 Marcelle Géniat as La mère de Victor
 Andrex as Robert Cerani
 Georges Flamant as Amédée
 Charles Blavette as Le premier inspecteur 
 Marcel Maupi as Rémi 
 Charblay as M. Noir
 Armand Larcher as L'inspecteur #2
 Viviane Romance as Adrienne Robineau
 Roger Peter as Un enfant 
 Daniel Kahya as Un enfant
 Odette Roger as Mme Marie
 Édouard Delmont as Paroli

References

Bibliography
 Driskell, Jonathan. The French Screen Goddess: Film Stardom and the Modern Woman in 1930s France. I.B.Tauris, 2015.

External links 
 

1938 films
1938 drama films
French drama films
German drama films
1930s French-language films
Films directed by Jean Grémillon
Films shot at Tempelhof Studios
UFA GmbH films
French black-and-white films
German black-and-white films
1930s French films
1930s German films